Casson may refer to the following people: 
Given name
Casson Ferguson (1891–1929), American film actor
Casson Trenor, American environmentalist, social activist, and media personality

Surname 
 A. J. Casson (1898–1992), Canadian artist
A. J. Casson Award
Amy Casson, British slalom canoeist
 Andrew Casson (born 1943), Anglo-American mathematician
Casson invariant
Casson handle
Ann Casson (1915–1990), English stage and film actress
 Beau Casson (born 1982), Australian cricketer
Christopher Casson (1912-1996), English-born actor who became a citizen of Ireland in 1946
 Elizabeth Casson (1881–1954), British doctor and occupational therapy pioneer
Felice Casson (born 1953), Italian magistrate and politician
François Boux de Casson (1908–1981), French aristocrat, landowner and politician
Henry Casson (1843–1912), American politician
Henry Casson (cricketer) (1830–1902), English cricketer
 Herbert Newton Casson (1869–1951), Canadian author and journalist
 Hugh Casson (1910–1999), British architect
Jacob Casson Geiger (1885-1981), city director of public health in San Francisco and Oakland, CA
Johnnie Casson, English comedian
Leslie Casson (1903–1969), English mediaevalist and art historian
 Lewis Casson (1875–1969), British actor, father of Ann
 Lionel Casson (1914–2009), American classicist
Margaret Casson (1913–1999), British architect, designer and photographer, wife of Hugh
Mark Casson (born 1945), British economist and academic
Mary Casson (1914–2009), English theatre access
 Mel Casson (1920–2008), American cartoonist
Michael Casson (1925–2003), English studio potter
Rick Casson (born 1948), Canadian politician
Tom Casson (born 1990), English rugby union player
Walter Casson (1895–1965), English football forward
William Casson (1796–1886), English botanist, seed merchant and historian
William Thompson Casson (1844–1909), English coach designer and manufacturer